Dogs have played a role in the religion, myths, tales, and legends of many cultures.

Religions, myths, legends, and cultures 
In mythology, dogs often serve as pets or as watchdogs. Stories of dogs guarding the gates of the underworld recur throughout Indo-European mythologies and may originate from Proto-Indo-European religion.  Historian Julien d'Huy has suggested three narrative lines related to dogs in mythology.  One echoes the gatekeeping noted above in Indo-European mythologies—a linkage with the afterlife; a second "related to the union of humans and dogs"; a third relates to the association of dogs with the star Sirius.  Evidence presented by d'Huy suggests a correlation between the mythological record from cultures and the genetic and fossil record related to dog domestication.

Below entries are arranged in alphabetical order.

Aztec religion 

Dogs had a major religious and symbolic significance to the Aztec peoples of central Mexico. Several ancient burial sites for dogs have been discovered in Mexico. Xolotl, an Aztec god of death, was depicted as a dog-headed monster.

Chinese tradition 

The dog is one of the 12 animals honoured in Chinese astrology. The second day of the Chinese New Year is considered to be the birthday of all dogs and Chinese people often take care to be kind to dogs on that day. In China, Korea and Japan, dogs are viewed as kind protectors. Panhu is a dragon-dog who transformed into a man and married a princess.

Christianity 

In Christianity, dogs represent faithfulness. Within the Roman Catholic denomination specifically, the iconography of Saint Dominic includes a dog, after the hallow's mother dreamt of a dog springing from her womb and becoming pregnant shortly after that. As such, the Dominican Order (Ecclesiastical Latin: Domini canis) means "dog of the Lord" or "hound of the Lord" (Ecclesiastical Latin: Domini canis). In Christian folklore, a church grim often takes the form of a black dog to guard Christian churches and their churchyards from sacrilege.

A dog is mentioned in the deuterocanonical Book of Tobit, faithfully accompanying Tobias, Tobit's son and the angel Raphael on their journeys.

Jesus told the story of the poor man Lazarus, whose sores were licked by street dogs. This has traditionally been seen as showing Lazarus's wretched situation.

The Roman Catholic Church recognizes Saint Roch (also called Saint Rocco), who lived in the early 14th century in France, as the patron saint of dogs. It is said that he caught the plague while doing charitable work and went into the forest, expecting to die. There he was befriended by a dog that licked his sores and brought him food, and he was able to recover. The feast day of Saint Roch, August 16, is celebrated in Bolivia as the "birthday of all dogs."

Saint Guinefort was the name given to a dog who received local veneration as a saint at a French shrine from the 13th to the 20th centuries.

A black and white dog is sometimes used as an informal symbol of the Dominican Order of friars, religious sisters and nuns.

Ancient Egyptian religion 
The Ancient Egyptians are often more associated with cats in the form of Bastet, but dogs are found to have a sacred role and figure as an important symbol in religious iconography.

Dogs were associated with Anubis, the jackal headed god of the underworld. At times throughout its period of being in use the Anubieion catacombs at Saqqara saw the burial of dogs. Anput was the female counterpart of her husband, Anubis, she was often depicted as a pregnant or nursing jackal, or as a jackal wielding knives.

Other dogs can be found in Egyptian mythology. Am-heh was a minor god from the underworld. He was depicted as a man with the head of a hunting dog who lived in a lake of fire. Duamutef was originally represented as a man wrapped in mummy bandages. From the New Kingdom onwards, he is shown with the head of a jackal. Wepwawet was depicted as a wolf or a jackal, or as a man with the head of a wolf or a jackal. Even when considered a jackal, Wepwawet usually was shown with grey, or white fur, reflecting his lupine origins. Khenti-Amentiu was depicted as a jackal-headed deity at Abydos in Upper Egypt, who stood guard over the city of the dead.

Greek mythology 
Dogs were closely associated with Hecate in the Classical world. Dogs were sacred to Artemis and Ares. Cerberus is a three-headed, dragon-tailed watchdog who guards the gates of Hades. Laelaps was a dog in Greek mythology. When Zeus was a baby, a dog, known only as the "golden hound" was charged with protecting the future King of Gods. In Homer's epic poem the Odyssey, when the disguised Odysseus returns home after 20 years, he is recognized only by his faithful dog, Argos, who has been waiting all this time for his return.

Based on Greek mythology, three of the 88 constellations in Western astronomy also represent dogs:
 Canis Major (the Great Dog, whose brightest star, Sirius, is also called the Dog Star)
 Canis Minor (the Little Dog)
 Canes Venatici (the Hunting Dogs)

Hinduism 

In Hindu mythology, Yama, the god of death, owns two watchdogs who have four eyes. They are said to watch over the gates of Naraka. The hunter god Muthappan from the North Malabar region of Kerala has a hunting dog as his mount. Dogs are found in and out of the Muthappan Temple and offerings at the shrine take the form of bronze dog figurines.

The dog (Shvan) is also the vahana or mount of the Hindu god Bhairava. Yudhishthira had approached heaven with his dog who was the god Yama himself, therefore among many Hindus, the common belief exists that caring for or adopting dogs can also pave the way to heaven. Dogs are also shown in the background in the iconography of Hindu deities like Dattatreya, many times dogs are also shown in the background in the iconography of deities like Khandoba. In Valmiki Ramayana there's a tale about a dog receiving justice,
passed by king Rama.

Islam 

The view on dogs in Islam is mixed, with some schools of thought viewing them as unclean, although Khaled Abou El Fadl states that this view is based on "pre-Islamic Arab mythology" and "a tradition to be falsely attributed to the Prophet." Therefore, Sunni Malaki and Hanafi jurists permit the trade of and keeping of dogs as pets.

The majority of both Sunni and Shi'a Muslim jurists consider dogs ritually unclean. It is uncommon for practicing Muslims to keep dogs as pets.
However, the majority of Muslims would touch and pet dogs as long as they are completely dry because touching dry dogs is believed to remove impurities from them.
In Britain, police sniffer dogs are carefully used, and they are not permitted to touch passengers, instead, they are only permitted to touch their luggage. They are required to wear leather dog booties whenever they enter and search mosques or Muslim homes.

There are a number of traditions concerning Muhammad's attitude towards dogs. He said that the company of dogs, except as helpers in hunting, herding, and home protection, voided a portion of a Muslim's good deeds.  On the other hand, he advocated kindness to dogs and other animals. Abu Huraira narrated that the prophet said:
"While a man was walking he felt thirsty and went down a well, and drank water from it. On coming out of it, he saw a dog panting and eating mud because of excessive thirst. The man said, 'This (dog) is suffering from the same problem as that of mine.' So, he (went down the well), filled his shoe with water, caught hold of it with his teeth, and climbed up and watered the dog. Allah thanked him for his (good) deed and forgave him. The people asked O Allah's Apostle! Is there a reward for us in serving (the) animals? He replied: ``Yes, there is a reward for serving any animate (living being).

Judaism 
There is controversy about whether Jewish rabbinical law authorizes the keeping of dogs as pets. Biblical and rabbinic sources include numerous references that associate dogs with violence and uncleanliness and frown on having dogs as pets or keeping them in one’s home. Dogs are negatively portrayed in both the Hebrew Bible and the Talmud, where they are mostly associated with violence and uncleanliness. Deuteronomy 23:18 appears to equate dogs with prostitution, and the Book of Kings describes dogs who feed on corpses. The Psalms describes dogs as beasts that maul at human beings.

This negative view of dogs is also found in the Talmud, which describes people who raise dogs as cursed. In July 2019, all the Sephardic Rabbis from the Israeli city of Elad signed an edict banning dogs from the city, with the justification that "as explained in the Talmud and by the Rambam, anyone raising a dog is accursed". At the same year, the rabbi of Holon, Avraham Yosef, was also quoted as saying: “I do not find any grounds for permitting any dog whatsoever in any manner”.

The Misneh Torah states that dogs must be chained because they are known to frequently cause damage. The Shulchan Aruch states that only evil dogs must be bound and chained. 18th-century Rabbi and talmudist Jacob Emden permitted dogs for economic or security reasons, but affirmed that having a dog merely for pleasure was “precisely the behavior of the uncircumcised”.

Judaism does not permit the neglect or abuse of any living animal. Jewish law states that any animal that is kept must be fed, and it also states that arrangements for feeding them must be made before they are obtained. This ruling also applies to dogs.

Levant 
During archaeological diggings, the Ashkelon dog cemetery was discovered in the layer dating from when the city was part of the Persian Empire. It is believed the dogs may have had a sacred role – however, evidence for this is not conclusive.

Mesopotamia 
In ancient Mesopotamia, from the Old Babylonian period until the Neo-Babylonian, dogs were the symbol of Ninisina, the goddess of healing and medicine, and her worshippers frequently dedicated small models of seated dogs to her. In the Neo-Assyrian and Neo-Babylonian periods, dogs were used as emblems of magical protection.

There is a temple in Isin, Mesopotamia, named é-ur-gi7-ra which translates as "dog house". Enlilbani, a king from the Old Babylonian First Dynasty of Isin, commemorated the temple to the goddess Ninisina. Although there is a small amount of detail known about it, there is enough information to confirm that a dog cult did exist in this area. Usually, dogs were only associated with the Gula cult, but there is some information, like Enlilbani's commemoration, to suggest that dogs were also important to the cult of Ninisina, as Gula was another goddess who was closely associated to Ninisina. More than 30 dog burials, numerous dog sculptures, and dog drawings were discovered when the area around this Ninisina temple was excavated. In the Gula cult, the dog was used in oaths and was sometimes referred to as a divinity.

In Persian mythology, two four-eyed dogs guard the Chinvat Bridge.

Norse
In Norse mythology, a bloody, four-eyed dog called Garmr guards Helheim. Also, Fenrir is a giant wolf who is a child of the Norse god Loki, who was foretold to kill Odin in the events of Ragnarok.

Philippines
In Philippine mythology, Kimat, the pet of Tadaklan, the god of thunder, is responsible for lightning.

Wales
In Welsh mythology, Annwn is guarded by Cŵn Annwn.

Zoroastrianism 
In Zoroastrianism, the dog is regarded as an especially beneficent, clean and righteous creature, which must be fed and taken care of. The dog is praised for the useful work it performs in the household, but it is also seen as having special spiritual virtues. Dogs are associated with Yama who guards the gates of afterlife with his dogs just like Hinduism. A dog's gaze is considered to be purifying and to drive off daevas (demons). It is also believed to have a special connection with the afterlife: the Chinwad Bridge to Heaven is said to be guarded by dogs in Zoroastrian scripture, and dogs are traditionally fed in commemoration of the dead. Ihtiram-i sag, "respect for the dog", is a common injunction among Iranian Zoroastrian villagers.

Detailed prescriptions for the appropriate treatment of dogs are found in the Vendidad (a subdivision of the Zoroastrian holy scripture Avesta), especially in chapters 13, 14 and 15, where harsh punishments are imposed for harm inflicted upon a dog and the faithful are required to assist dogs, both domestic and stray, in various ways; often, help or harm to a dog is equated with help and harm to a human. The killing of a dog ("a shepherd's dog, or a house-dog, or a Vohunazga [i.e. stray] dog, or a trained dog") is considered to lead to damnation in the afterlife. A homeowner is required to take care of a pregnant dog that lies near his home at least until the puppies are born (and in some cases until the puppies are old enough to take care of themselves, namely six months). If the homeowner does not help the dog and the puppies come to harm as a result, "he shall pay for it the penalty for wilful murder", because "Atar (Fire), the son of Ahura Mazda, watches as well (over a pregnant dog) as he does over a woman". It is also a major sin if a man harms a dog by giving it bones that are too hard and become stuck in its throat, or food that is too hot, so that it burns its throat. Giving bad food to a dog is as bad as serving bad food to a human. The believers are required to take care of a dog with a damaged sense of smell, to try to heal it "in the same manner as they would do for one of the faithful" and, if they fail, to tie it lest it should fall into a hole or a body of water and be harmed.

Both according to the Vendidad and in traditional Zoroastrian practice, dogs are allotted some funerary ceremonies analogous to those of humans. In the Vendidad, it is stated that the spirits of a thousand deceased dogs are reincarnated in a single otter ("water dog"), hence the killing of an otter is a terrible crime that brings drought and famine upon the land and must be atoned either by the death of the killer or by the killer performing a very long list of deeds considered pious, including the healing of dogs, raising of puppies, paying of fines to priests, as well as killing of animals considered noxious and unholy (cats, rats, mice and various species of reptiles, amphibians, and insects).

Sagdid is a funeral ceremony in which a dog is brought into the room where the body is lying so that it can look on it. "Sagdid" means "dog sight" in the Middle Persian language of Zoroastrian theological works. There are various spiritual benefits thought to be obtained by the ceremony. It is believed that the original purpose was to make certain that the person was really dead since the dog's more acute senses would be able to detect signs of life that a human might miss. A "four-eyed" dog, that is one with two spots on its forehead, is preferred for sagdid.

The traditional rites involving dogs have been under attack by reformist Zoroastrians since the mid-19th century, and they had abandoned them completely by the late 20th century. Even traditionalist Zoroastrians tend to restrict such rites to a significant extent nowadays (late 20th – early 21st century).

See also

References

External link